A Chrismon tree is an evergreen tree often placed in the chancel or nave of a church during Advent and Christmastide. The Chrismon tree was first used by North American Lutherans in 1957, although the practice has spread to other Christian denominations, including Anglicans, Catholics, Methodists, and the Reformed. As with the ordinary Christmas tree, the evergreen tree itself, for Christians, "symbolizes the eternal life Jesus Christ provides". However, the Chrismon tree differs from the traditional Christmas tree in that it "is decorated only with clear lights and Chrismons made from white and gold material", the latter two being the liturgical colours of the Christmas season.

The Chrismon tree is adorned with Chrismons, "ancient symbols for Christ or some part of Christ's ministry: the dove descending down, fish, Celtic cross, Jerusalem cross, shepherd's crook, chalice, shell, and others." Laurence Hull Stookey writes that "because many symbols of the Chrismon tree direct our attention to the nature and ultimate work of Christ, they can be helpful in calling attention to Advent themes."

See also 

Hanging of the greens
Hanukkah bush

References

External links 
Hand-sewn ornaments deck Chrismon tree with symbols by Rachel Lijewski - Temple Daily Telegram
Symbols of Christ: Chrismon tree decorations hold true spirit of holiday - The Times and Democrat
Christmas Decoration Yatai Decor
Chrismons - East Liberty Presbyterian Church

Advent
Christmas trees
Christmas decorations